Gompholobium virgatum, commonly known as leafy wedge pea, is a species of flowering plant in the family Fabaceae and is endemic to eastern Australia. It is a erect or sprawling shrub with trifoliate leaves, the leaflets narrow egg-shaped with the narrower end towards the base, and yellow and greenish, pea-like flowers.

Description

Taxonomy and naming
Gompholobium virgatum was first formally described in 1825 by Augustin Pyramus de Candolle in Prodromus Systematis Naturalis Regni Vegetabilis, from an unpublished description by Franz Sieber. The specific epithet (virgatum) means "virgate".

Distribution and habitat
Leafy wedge pea grows in heathland, woodland and open forest on the coast and tablelands from southern Queensland to southern New South Wales.

References

virgatum
Flora of New South Wales
Flora of Queensland
Plants described in 1825
Taxa named by Augustin Pyramus de Candolle